Humber East is a former provincial electoral district for the House of Assembly of Newfoundland and Labrador, Canada.

Includes the eastern section of Corner Brook as well as Humber Village, Little Rapids, Massey Drive, Pasadena and Steady Brook. There is a mix of urban and rural areas. The district is among the most prosperous in the province.

Humber East has elected a series of political heavyweights, including Clyde Wells, Tom Farrell, Lynn Verge and former premier Tom Marshall. Humber East was reconfigured into the districts of Corner Brook and Humber-Bay of Islands in 2015.

Members of the House of Assembly
The district has elected the following Members of the House of Assembly:

Election results

|-

|-
 
|NDP
|Marc Best
|align="right"|593
|align="right"|13.28
|align="right"|+8.12
|-

|-

|-

|-
 
|NDP
|Jean Graham
|align="right"|256
|align="right"|5.17
|align="right"|

|-

|-

|-

|-

|-
|-

|Independent
|David B. LeDrew
|align="right"|259 
|align="right"|4.24
|align="right"|
|-
 
|NDP
|Jean Mehaney
|align="right"|246
|align="right"|4.03
|align="right"|

Boundaries

The District of Humber East is located on the West Coast of Newfoundland, it takes in a portion of the City of Corner Brook, The towns of Massey Drive, Steady Brook, Humber Village, Little Rapids, and Pasadena. Its boundaries are as follows:

Begins at the intersection of the Meridian of 57° 30′ West Longitude and the southern shoreline
of Deer Lake;

Then running in a general southwesterly direction along the sinuosities of the southern shoreline
of Deer Lake to its intersection with the centre line of Blue Gulch Brook;

Then running in a general southeasterly direction along the centre line of Blue Gulch Brook to its
intersection with the centre line of Main Street, Pasadena;

Then running in a general southwesterly direction along the centre line of Main Street to its
intersection with the centre line of South Brook;

Then running in a general southeasterly direction along the centre line of South Brook to its
intersection with the Parallel of 49° North Latitude;

Then running due south to the point of intersection with the southern shoreline of Grand Lake;
Then running due west to its intersection with the centre line of the Trans Canada Highway;
Then running in a general northeasterly direction along the centre line of the Trans Canada
Highway to its intersection with the centre line of Lewin Parkway;

Then running in a general northwesterly direction along the centre line of Lewin Parkway to its
intersection with the centre line of Wheeler's Road;

Then running in a general northwesterly direction along the centre line of Wheeler's Road to its
intersection with the centre line of Pratt Street;

Then running in a general southwesterly direction along the centre line of Pratt Street to its
intersection with the centre line of Carter Avenue;

Then running in a general northwesterly direction along the centre line of Carter Avenue to its
intersection with the centre line of Elizabeth Street;

Then running in a general northwesterly direction along the centre line of Elizabeth Street to its
intersection with the centre line of Churchill Street;

Then running in a general northeasterly direction along the centre line of Churchill Street to its
intersection with the centre line of O’Connell Drive;

Then running in a general easterly direction along the centre line of O’Connell Drive to its
intersection with the centre line of Corner Brook Stream;

Then running in a general northwesterly direction along the centre line of Corner Brook Stream to its intersection with the southern shoreline of Humber Arm;
Then running in a general northeasterly direction along the sinuosities of Humber Arm and Humber River to the intersection with the centre line of the Bay of Islands North Shore Highway, Route #440;
Then running in a northeasterly direction to the summit of Old Man Mountain, north of Old Mans Pond;
Then running in an easterly direction to the point of beginning.

References

External links 
Newfoundland and Labrador House of Assembly
Newfoundland Votes 2003 - CBC

Corner Brook
Newfoundland and Labrador provincial electoral districts